XYZ is the 1989 debut album by the American hard rock band XYZ. There were two hits off the album, "Inside Out" and "What Keeps Me Loving You". The album was a moderate success, charting at No. 99 on the Billboard 200. There were two music videos made, for the songs "Inside Out" and "What Keeps Me Loving You", which both aired on MTV between 1989 and 1990.

Critical reception
Upon the release Ian McCann of New Musical Express described the music of the album as "polished, loud and unchallenged metal-rock."

Track listing 
All songs are written by Terry Ilous, Marc Richard Diglio and Pat Fontaine, except noted.
"Maggy" – 4:40
"Inside Out" – 4:10
"What Keeps Me Loving You" – 4:42
"Take What You Can" – 4:28
"Follow the Night" – 3:25
"Come On n' Love Me" – 3:49
"Souvenirs" (Terry Ilous, Pat Fontaine) – 3:56
"Tied Up" – 4:14
"Nice Day to Die" – 5:06
"After the Rain" – 2:50
"On the Blue Side of the Night" [2001 reissue bonus track] – 3:28

Bonus track is excerpted from "Inside Out / Take What You Can" single 12" (March 1990)

Personnel 
 Marc Richard Diglio – guitar, backing vocals
 Pat Fontaine – bass, backing vocals
 Terry Ilous – vocals
 Paul Monroe – drums, snare drums, backing vocals

Production
 Eddie Ashworth – engineer
 Wyn Davis – engineer
 Eddie DeLena – engineer, mixing
 Pat Dillon – art direction
 Don Dokken – producer
 Faun 	Clothing – wardrobe
 John Goodenough – engineer
 Dennis Keeley – photo enhancement
 Jeannine Pinkerton – typography
 Eddy Schreyer – mastering
 Melissa Sewell – engineer
 Neil Zlozower – photography

References

External links 
XYZ Album info

1989 debut albums
XYZ (American band) albums
Enigma Records albums